Wanted: Babysitter (also known as Scar Tissue, The Babysitter and The Raw Edge) is a 1975 Italian-French-German thriller–drama film directed by René Clément as his final film before his retirement in 1975. The film stars Maria Schneider, Sydne Rome, Vic Morrow, Robert Vaughn, and Nadja Tiller.

Plot
Michelle, a naive young girl, is forcefully kidnapped while babysitting the son of a wealthy food mogul. She and the boy are held hostage by an ex-stuntman and a vengeful movie star.

Cast 
 Maria Schneider as Michelle
 Sydne Rome as  Ann
 Vic Morrow as  Vic
 Robert Vaughn as  Stuart Chase
 John Whittington  as  'Boots' Peter Franklin
 Nadja Tiller  as Lotte
 Renato Pozzetto as Gianni
 Carl Möhner  as  Cyrus Franklin  
 Clelia Matania as   Old neighbour
 Marco Tulli as  Inspector  Trieste
 Armando Brancia as Inspector Carrara

Release
Wanted: Babysitter was released in French theatres on October 15, 1975. The film was released on DVD on June 1, 2004, initially, and later on January 1, 2005, and May 13, 2009. Wanted: Babysitter was digitally remastered on January 2, 2015.

References

Sources

External links

1975 films
1970s thriller drama films
Italian thriller drama films
French thriller drama films
German thriller drama films
West German films
Films directed by René Clément
Films with screenplays by Luciano Vincenzoni
Films set in Rome
Films scored by Francis Lai
English-language French films
English-language German films
English-language Italian films
1975 drama films
Films produced by Zev Braun
1970s Italian films
1970s French films
1970s German films